Wurlsee is a lake in Uckermark, Brandenburg, Germany. Its surface area is 1.6395 km². It is located in the town of Lychen.

See also
Nesselpfuhl
Oberpfuhl
Zenssee

External links

Lakes of Brandenburg
Uckermark (district)
LWurlsee